The 2006 Yukon general election was held on October 10, 2006, in Yukon, Canada, to elect members of the 32nd Yukon Legislative Assembly. The Premier of Yukon asked the territorial Commissioner for a dissolution of the  Assembly on September 8, 2006. Because of changes in the Yukon Act, the Yukon Party government's mandate resulting from this election is for as long as five years instead of four.

Results

By party

By region

By rank

Changes since the last election

Haakon Arntzen leaves the Yukon Party caucus after investigations into several sexual assault cases in the 70's and the 80's began. While serving as an independent, he was found guilty. The Opposition called for his resignation, however this was rebuffed by the Government who believed he should be sentenced first.
The Liberal Party held a leadership race after Pat Duncan lost the previous election moving from government to only one seat and third place. The party chose Arthur Mitchell over Duncan to lead the party.
Arntzen resigns from the legislature on September 9, 2005.  A by-election was held on November 21, 2005 to fill the Copperbelt seat and Liberal leader Arthur Mitchell won the election with almost 50% of the vote.
Peter Jenkins, member for Klondike, resigns from Yukon Party, November 28, 2005 and from the cabinet after a dispute with the Premier over the payment of loans.
Gary McRobb, member for Kluane, and Eric Fairclough, member for Mayo-Tatchun were expelled from the New Democratic Party (NDP) on February 28, 2006 and March 1, 2006 respectively when it is learned that they are exploring the possibility of running as independents or Liberals in the next election.
McRobb (on March 17, 2006) and Fairclough (on May 1, 2006) both joined the Liberal caucus.  Fairclough's joining brought the Liberals ahead of the NDP making them the official opposition. 
Edzerza on August 2, 2006 resigned from cabinet and the Yukon Party caucus; the following day, Edzerza said he would seek the NDP nomination in his riding. In accordance with NDP policy, Edzerza is to sit as an independent until nominated and elected as an NDP candidate.

Campaign slogans
Yukon Party: Imagine tomorrow
Yukon Liberal Party: Putting people first
Yukon New Democratic Party: Leading the way

Results by riding
names in bold indicate cabinet ministers, names in italics are party leaders

Rural Yukon

|-
| style="background:whitesmoke;"|Klondike
|| 
|Steve Nordick  405
|
|Steve Taylor  132
|
|Jorn Meier  297
|
|Glen Everitt  56
|| 
|Peter Jenkins
|-
| style="background:whitesmoke;"|Kluane
|
|Jim Bowers  176
|| 
|Gary McRobb  317
|
|Lillian Grubach-Hambrook  82
|
|Freddy Hutter  19
|| 
|Gary McRobb 
|-
| style="background:whitesmoke;"|Lake Laberge
|| 
|Brad Cathers  458
|
|Jon Breen  221
|
|Nina Sutherland  120
|
|
|| 
|Brad Cathers
|-
| style="background:whitesmoke;"|Mayo-Tatchun
|
|Jean VanBibber  166
|| 
|Eric Fairclough  301
|
|Karen Gage  99 
|
|
|| 
|Eric Fairclough
|-
| style="background:whitesmoke;"|Mount Lorne
|
|Valerie Boxall  236
|
|Colleen Wirth  231
||
|Steve Cardiff  361
|
|
|| 
|Steve Cardiff
|-
| style="background:whitesmoke;"|Pelly-Nisutlin
|| 
|Marian Horne  241
|
|Hammond Dick  145
|
|Gwen Wally  146
|
|Elvis Aaron Presley ("Tagish" Elvis Presley)  40
|| 
|Dean Hassard
|-
| style="background:whitesmoke;"|Southern Lakes
|| 
|Patrick Rouble  276
|
|Ethel Tizya  134
|
|Kevin Barr  238
|
|
|| 
|Patrick Rouble
|-
| style="background:whitesmoke;"|Vuntut Gwitchin
|
|William Josie  37
|| 
|Darius Elias  65
|
|Lorraine Peter  40
|
|
|| 
|Lorraine Peter
|-
| style="background:whitesmoke;"|Watson Lake
|| 
|Dennis Fentie  495
|
|Rick Harder  196
|
|Rachael Lewis  45
|
|Dale Robert Worsfold  28
|| 
|Dennis Fentie
|}

Whitehorse

|-
| style="background:whitesmoke;"|Copperbelt
|
|Russ Hobbis  374
|| 
|Arthur Mitchell  632
|
|David Hedmann  191
|
| 
|| 
|Arthur Mitchell
|-
| style="background:whitesmoke;"|McIntyre-Takhini
|
|Vicki Durrant  201
|
|Ed Schultz  328
|| 
|John Edzerza  334
|
|
|| 
|John Edzerza
|-
| style="background:whitesmoke;"|Porter Creek Centre
|| 
|Archie Lang  344
|
|David Laxton  224
|
|Kate White  159
|
| 
|| 
|Archie Lang
|-
| style="background:whitesmoke;"|Porter Creek North
||
|Jim Kenyon  311
|
|Dale Cheeseman  191
|
|Dave Hobbis  158
|
|
|| 
|Jim Kenyon
|-
| style="background:whitesmoke;"|Porter Creek South
|
|Dean Hassard  298 
|| 
|Don Inverarity  304
|
|Samson Hartland  97
|
| 
|| 
|Pat Duncan
|-
| style="background:whitesmoke;"|Riverdale North
|| 
|Ted Staffen  429
|
|Lesley Cabott  377
|
|James McCullough  172
|
| 
|| 
|Ted Staffen
|-
| style="background:whitesmoke;"|Riverdale South
|| 
|Glenn Hart  357
|
|Phil Treusch  324
|
|Peter Lesniak  226
|
| 
|| 
|Glenn Hart
|-
| style="background:whitesmoke;"|Whitehorse Centre
|
|Jerry Johnson  188
|
|Bernie Phillips  211
|| 
|Todd Hardy  357
|
|
|| 
|Todd Hardy
|-
| style="background:whitesmoke;"|Whitehorse West
|| 
|Elaine Taylor  511
|
|Mike Walton  371
|
|Rhoda Merkel  75
|
| 
|| 
|Elaine Taylor
|}

Opinion polls

Trendlines polls from October 2005 to June 2006 are based on a 100-day rolling average. Trendlines polls from July 2006 to October 2006 only include the respective monthly figures.

Trendlines has conducted a poll in every riding every month for several months. According to the September/October polls, the Yukon Party could form a minority government with 7 of the 18 seats; or the Liberal Party and NDP could form a majority coalition with 11 out of the 18 seats.

*Independent candidate Tim Zeigdel has since withdrawn.
TrendLines Research

References

External links
Election Almanac - Yukon Territorial Election
Yukon Votes 2006. Canadian Broadcasting Corporation.

2006
2006 elections in Canada
Election
October 2006 events in Canada